Fish longganisa or fish chorizo, is a Filipino sausage made with fish instead of pork or beef. It is typically made from tuna, tilapia, or milkfish. It is prepared identically to other Filipino longganisa and is marketed as a healthier alternative. It may use regular pork casings, vegetable-based casings, or are prepared "skinless" (without the casing).

See also
Cabanatuan longganisa
Chicken longganisa
List of sausages

References

Philippine sausages
Philippine seafood dishes